"If You Come Back" is a song by English boy band Blue, released as the third single from their debut studio album, All Rise (2001). It was written by Ray Ruffin, Nicole Formescu, Ian Hope, and Lee Brennan of boy band 911. The song topped the UK charts for one week becoming their second consecutive number one single release and has received a silver sales status certification for sales of over 200,000 copies in the UK.

Track listings
UK CD single
 "If You Come Back" (radio edit) – 3:27
 "If You Come Back" (8 Jam Streetmix) – 4:56
 "If You Come Back" (Blacksmith Smooth RnB Rub) – 3:54
 "If You Come Back" (video) – 3:24

UK cassette single and European CD single
 "If You Come Back" (radio edit) – 3:27
 "If You Come Back" (The Playa's Mix) – 3:57

Australian CD single
 "If You Come Back" (radio edit)
 "If You Come Back" (8 Jam Streetmix)
 "If You Come Back" (Blacksmith Smooth RnB rub)
 "Too Close" (live from Rumba, Melbourne)
 "If You Come Back" (video)

Credits and personnel
Credits are taken from the All Rise album booklet.

Studios
 Recorded at Ruffland Studios and Stanley House Studios (London, England)
 Mixed at Stanley House Studios (London, England)
 Mastered at Sterling Sound (New York City) and Sony Music Studios (London, England)

Personnel

 Ray Ruffin – writing, backing vocals, bass, keys, programming, production
 Nicole Formescu – writing
 Ian Hope – writing
 Lee Brennan – writing
 Blue – lead vocals, backing vocals
 Andrew Smith – guitar
 Damien Egan – acoustic guitars, keys, programming
 Phil Hudson – acoustic guitars
 Ned Douglas – additional beats
 Pete Craigie – additional production and mix
 Stevie Lange – additional vocal production
 Dan Porter – assistant engineering
 Adrian Hall – assistant engineering
 Tom Coyne – mastering
 John Davis – mastering

Charts

Weekly charts

Year-end charts

Certifications and sales

Release history

References

2001 singles
2001 songs
Blue (English band) songs
Innocent Records singles
UK Singles Chart number-one singles
Virgin Records singles